The Netherlands was represented by Bernadette, with the song "Sing Me a Song", at the 1983 Eurovision Song Contest, which took place in Munich on 23 April. Bernadette was the winner of the Dutch national final for the contest, held on 23 February.

Before Eurovision

Nationaal Songfestival 1983 
The final was held at the Congresgebouw in The Hague, hosted by Ivo Niehe. Five acts took part performing two songs each and voting was by 12 regional juries, who each had 30 points to divide between the songs. "Sing Me a Song" emerged the unexpected winner by a margin of just 1 point over the pre-final favourite "Een beetje van dit" by Vulcano, largely thanks to the South Holland jury awarding 19 of its 30 points to the song.

At Eurovision 
On the night of the final Bernadette performed 11th in the running order, following Greece and preceding Yugoslavia. At the close of voting "Sing Me a Song" had received 66 points, placing the Netherlands 7th of the 20 entries. The Dutch jury awarded its 12 points to Israel.

The Dutch conductor at the contest was Piet Souer.

Voting

References

External links 
 Dutch Preselection 1983

1983
Countries in the Eurovision Song Contest 1983
Eurovision